The 1960 French Championships (now known as the French Open) was a tennis tournament that took place on the outdoor clay courts at the Stade Roland-Garros in Paris, France. The tournament ran from 17 May until 29 May. It was the 64th staging of the French Championships, and the second Grand Slam tennis event of 1960. Nicola Pietrangeli and Darlene Hard won the singles titles.

Finals

Men's singles

 Nicola Pietrangeli defeated  Luis Ayala 3–6, 6–3, 6–4, 4–6, 6–3

Women's singles

 Darlene Hard defeated  Yola Ramírez 6–3, 6–4

Men's doubles

 Roy Emerson /   Neale Fraser defeated  José Luis Arilla /  Andrés Gimeno  6–2, 8–10, 7–5, 6–4

Women's doubles

 Maria Bueno /  Darlene Hard defeated  Pat Ward Hales /  Ann Haydon 6–2, 7–5

Mixed doubles

 Maria Bueno /  Bob Howe defeated  Ann Haydon /  Roy Emerson  1–6, 6–1, 6–2

References

External links
 French Open official website

French Championships
French Championships (tennis) by year
French Championships (tennis)
French Championships (tennis)
French Championships (tennis)